Hypocalymma elongatum is a member of the family Myrtaceae endemic to Western Australia.

It is found along the south coast in the Great Southern  regions of Western Australia between Cranbrook and Albany.

References

elongatum
Endemic flora of Western Australia
Rosids of Western Australia
Plants described in 2010
Taxa named by Barbara Lynette Rye